Lumière and Company is a 1995 anthology film made in collaboration between forty-one international film directors. The project consists of short films made by each of the filmmakers using the original  camera invented by the Lumière brothers.

The shorts were edited in-camera and constrained by three rules:
A short may be no longer than 52 seconds
No synchronized sound
No more than three takes

Directors

Summary 

 Patrice Leconte: A recreation of L'Arrivée d'un train en gare de La Ciotat 100 years later at the same station.
 Gabriel Axel: The evolution of the arts is shown, culminating in cinema. Then, two men shoot each other in a duel.
 Claude Miller: A girl is repeatedly pushed off a scale by others, before a man picks her up and puts her on his shoulders before getting on the scale.
 Jacques Rivette: A girl plays hopscotch while a woman roller-skates. The roller-skating woman collides with a man reading a newspaper.
 Michael Haneke: Various shots of TV news on March 19, 1995, exactly 100 years after the filming of L'Arrivée d'un train en gare de La Ciotat.
 Fernando Trueba: Felix Romero, A conscientious objector who has refused to partake in Spanish military service, departs from a prison in Zaragoza.
 Merzak Allouache: A couple walk through a park and notice the camera. They both examine it before the man shoves the woman out of the way.
 Raymond Depardon: Children use a ladder to put a hat on top of a large statue.
 Wim Wenders: Two men examine a cityscape.
 Jaco Van Dormael: A smiling couple kiss.
 Nadine Trintignant: Tourists wander around the courtyard of the Louvre.
 Régis Wargnier: A man in a park walks toward the camera. Voiceover recollects a scene from a film.
 Hugh Hudson: Japanese schoolchildren in Hiroshima visit a monument. Audio from news reports of the bombing of Hiroshima plays.
 Zhang Yimou: A man plays a traditional Chinese bowed musical instrument while a woman dances. They switch from their traditional clothing to punk fashion and the man plays a guitar while the woman thrashes her head.
 Liv Ullmann: Cinematographer Sven Nykvist operates his camera.
 Vicente Aranda: A victory parade drives through the street.
 Lucian Pintilie: People climb into a helicopter. The helicopter lifts off.
 John Boorman: Behind-the-scenes of the filming of Michael Collins.
 Claude Lelouch: A couple embraces as various camera crews move around them.
 Abbas Kiarostami: An egg fries on a skillet. A voicemail plays.
 Lasse Hallström: A woman with a baby waves at a passing train.
 Costa-Gavras: Various young adults gather around to look at the camera.
 Yoshishige Yoshida: Alternates between a shot of Yoshida with the camera and a destroyed building in Hiroshima while the sound of an explosion is heard. 
 Idrissa Ouedraogo: A man goes for a swim in a river before being scared off by another man wearing a mask.
 Gaston Kaboré: Outside of a cinema, a group of friends with a camera discover a truck full of filmstrips.
 Youssef Chahine: Two men film the Pyramids of Giza. Another man runs up the them and destroys their camera before storming off.
 Helma Sanders-Brahms: A tribute to Louis Cochet - a man directs lighting equipment next to a waterfall.
 Francis Girod: A large image of a television displaying a director in his chair is painted over with white paint.
 Cédric Klapisch: A man and a woman attempt to act out a scene where they embrace.
 Alain Corneau: A woman dances as her clothes rapidly change colors.
 Merchant & Ivory: People wander the city streets of Paris.
 Jerry Schatzberg: A garbage worker puts trash in the back of his truck. A woman gets into an argument with him when she doesn't want to give up her trash.
 Spike Lee: Footage of his newly-bord daughter, Satchel Lee.
 Andrei Konchalovsky: In a natural landscape, the carcass of an animal slowly decays.
 Peter Greenaway: Various images, including the Lumière brothers, various years, a nude man sitting in a chair
 Bigas Luna: A nude woman sitting in a field nurses a baby.
 Arthur Penn: A man tied to a bed screams out. In the bunk above him is a pregnant woman.
 David Lynch: Police discover a murder victim and inform the family.
 Theo Angelopoulos: Homer wakes up on a rocky seashore. In his attempts to figure out where he is, he stares down the camera.

References

External links

1996 films
Auguste and Louis Lumière
Films directed by Merzak Allouache
Films directed by Theodoros Angelopoulos
Films directed by Vicente Aranda
Films directed by Gabriel Axel
Films directed by John Boorman
Films directed by Youssef Chahine
Films directed by Alain Corneau
Films directed by Raymond Depardon
Films directed by Costa Gavras
Films directed by Francis Girod
Films directed by Peter Greenaway
Films directed by Lasse Hallström
Films directed by Michael Haneke
Films directed by Hugh Hudson
Films directed by James Ivory
Films directed by Gaston Kaboré
Films directed by Abbas Kiarostami
Films directed by Cédric Klapisch
Films directed by Andrei Konchalovsky
Films directed by Patrice Leconte
Films directed by Spike Lee
Films directed by Claude Lelouch
Films directed by Bigas Luna
Films directed by David Lynch
Films directed by Ismail Merchant
Films directed by Claude Miller
Films directed by Sarah Moon
Films directed by Idrissa Ouedraogo
Films directed by Arthur Penn
Films directed by Lucian Pintilie
Films directed by Jacques Rivette
Films directed by Helma Sanders-Brahms
Films directed by Jerry Schatzberg
Films directed by Nadine Trintignant
Films directed by Fernando Trueba
Films directed by Liv Ullmann
Films directed by Jaco Van Dormael
Films directed by Régis Wargnier
Films directed by Wim Wenders
Films directed by Yoshishige Yoshida
Films directed by Zhang Yimou
Films shot in Barcelona
Films with screenplays by David Lynch
1990s British films